The 1913 University of Utah football team was an American football team that represented the University of Utah as a member of the Rocky Mountain Conference during the 1913 college football season. Led by Fred Bennion in his fifth in the final season as head coach, Utah compiled an overall record of 2–4–1 with a mark of 1–2 in conference play, placing fifth in the RMC.

Schedule

References

University of Utah
Utah Utes football seasons
University of Utah football